The Renault Talisman is a large family car manufactured by the French car manufacturer Renault since 2015. It replaced the Renault Laguna, as well as the larger Renault Latitude, for which no direct replacement was scheduled. It was  produced by Renault's Douai Renault Factory from 2015 to 2022 and it is produced by its South Korean subsidiary Renault Korea Motors (previously named Renault Samsung Motors) since 2016 and marketed as the Renault Korea Motors SM6 (until 2022, it was marketed as the Renault Samsung SM6).

The name "talisman" means "a magical object providing protection against ill will, or the supernatural, or conferring the wearer with a boon such as good luck, good health, or powers".

Renault ended production of the Talisman in Europe in February 2022.

Overview
The saloon version of the Talisman was first unveiled on 6 July 2015, at the Château de Chantilly by Renault's CEO Carlos Ghosn, with an estate version scheduled to be revealed at the 2015 Frankfurt Motor Show. The two versions were allegedly codenamed LFD (saloon) and KFD (estate).

The car is based on the CMF CD platform, jointly developed by Renault and Nissan, and is the second Renault car to use it following the Espace. The use of the new platform is aimed at giving the Talisman a production volume advantage, that its predecessor (the Laguna) never achieved.  Renault executives stated that, like the new crossover, the Espace V, it will not be engineered for right-hand drive markets, due to the decline in the traditional saloon market.

The use of the Talisman name is intended as a way of unifying Renault nomenclature across the world, as Renault already sells in China a similar car named Talisman. Renault said the name "conjures up notions of both protection and power. At the same time, Talisman is an easy word to pronounce and understand the world over".

Design and technical details
The Talisman is slightly larger than the Laguna, with a lower centre of gravity. Renault focused on design, equipment and comfort with the aim of regaining market share in the large family car segment. Daimler personnel visited the car manufacturing site at Douai, and gave input on quality control and perceived quality.

According to Renault staff, they wanted to give the car the "fluid and emotional" aspect of smaller models from the company. They also tried to achieve a more "classic" styling than the used for its predecessor with the aim of gaining market share from the business fleets. 

The Talisman is the first large Renault car since the Renault 18 in the 1980s for which no hatchback body is available either as standard or as an option. The car had originally five trim levels for Europe (Life, Zen, Business, Intens, and Initiale Paris).

In March 2018, Renault unveiled a sportier trim level powered by a 1.8-litre petrol engine called S Edition, aimed to be introduced in the market by September 2018. In South Korea, the car was launched with up to four trim levels (PE, SE, LE and RE), although their number varied according to the engine used. 

In March 2018, Renault Samsung introduced a minor facelift for the market in South Korean, with some exterior changes, interior equipment updates and a new colouring option. In July 2019, Renault Samsung launched a new high end trim, called Premiere.
 
The car has a four wheel steering system (called 4 Control) which is not available in the South Korean version. It also incorporates a system (Multi Sense) which allows adjusting all car settings (on the cabin as well as mechanicals) between four pre-set options called Comfort, Sport, Eco and Neutral, and a user configurable option called Perso.

As an optional, the Talisman has a new infotainment system with an 8.7-inch touchscreen introduced in the fifth generation Espace, called R Link 2 (S Link in South Korea). The equipment also include adaptive cruise control, lane departure warning, traffic sign detection with excess speed warning and blind spot alert. 

The car scored a five star rating at the tests for Euro NCAP in 2015.

Gearboxes are six/seven speed dual-clutch automatic, six speed manual and CVT (the latter only available in a liquefied petroleum gas version sold in South Korea). Suspension is made of Pseudo MacPherson struts on front and a semi rigid axle on rear, with an optional active suspension system. Brakes are discs on both axles.

The Talisman received technological updates in February 2020, including new LED Matrix headlamps with adaptive lighting, 10.2-inch digital instrument cluster, 9.3-inch 'Easy Link' portrait style touchscreen infotainment system, and a range of advanced driver assistance systems (ADAS).

Engines 
The Talisman is powered by a range of petrol and diesel engines in both Europe and South Korea. The diesel engined versions were not initially sold in South Korea, while there is a liquefied petroleum gas version only for the market in South Korea. In August 2016, a diesel version was introduced for the market in South Korea. 

In November 2018, Renault announced the introduction of both petrol and diesel WLTP compliant engines.

Recalls
Renault Samsung ordered a recall of 94,069 RS SM6 saloon due to concerns of loose plastic covers on accelerator and brake pedals uncovered in a safety investigation. The company was fined 611 million won (US$530,000) by the Ministry of Land, Infrastructure and Transport for violating vehicle safety regulations.

Talisman Concept

The Renault Talisman is an unrelated concept executive car designed after the 1995 Renault Initiale Paris Concept line by Renault chief designer Patrick Le Quément, and it was presented at the Frankfurt Motor Show in September 2001. The first sketches were drawn in the beginning of 2000, and first referred as Renault Z12. There were four final 1/5 scale models and a judging team, led by Patrick le Quément, selected this coupé.

The Talisman was designed as a three door 2+2 coupé with four comfortable seats, but with only two gullwing doors and a coupé style ending. It applies the "Touch Design" concept, to make materials and controls soft and ergonomic. On 20 June 2001, the vehicle was named "Talisman", having previously referred as Renault Z12.

As equipment it has LCD screens instead of mirrors, GPS and a Tag Heuer clock in the middle of the board. The board slides up giving access to a giant glovebox. The seats are coloured of dark red, and the seat belts are fixed in the center of the seat structure and attach at the outer edge, using a bench seat for both the front and rear passengers. The steering wheel, brake and throttle are adjustable.

There are  disc brakes with six pistons. There are also twin metallic suitcases located in the trunk, and fixed to it.
The design of the Talisman was followed by the Mégane IV.

References

External links

 (France)
 (Estate - France)
 (Renault Samsung SM6)

Talisman
Talisman
Mid-size cars
Executive cars
Coupés
Sedans
Station wagons
Euro NCAP large family cars
Cars introduced in 2015
Flagship vehicles